Donald A. Campbell (August 2, 1922 – November 8, 1992) was an American lawyer and politician from New York.

Life
He was born on August 2, 1922, in Amsterdam, Montgomery County, New York. He graduated from Columbia University. During World War II he served as a lieutenant in the U.S. Army. He graduated from Albany Law School in 1948, was admitted to the bar, and practiced law in Amsterdam. He also entered politics as a Republican. He married Phyllis Topping (1923–2014), and they had three children.

He was a member of the New York State Assembly from 1951 to 1968, sitting in the 168th, 169th, 170th, 171st, 172nd, 173rd, 174th, 175th, 176th and 177th New York State Legislatures.

He was Clerk of the New York State Assembly from January 8, 1969, to February 1973, officiating in the 178th, 179th and 180th New York State Legislatures. He resigned the post in February 1973.

He died on November 8, 1992.

References

1922 births
1992 deaths
People from Montgomery County, New York
Republican Party members of the New York State Assembly
Clerks of the New York State Assembly
Columbia University alumni
Albany Law School alumni
20th-century American politicians
United States Army personnel of World War II